Jürgen Luh (born 1963) is a German historian and exhibition curator. He specialises in the history of Prussia and Germany from the Peace of Westphalia to the early nineteenth century.

The Holy Roman Empire 

Luh did his PhD with Gerd Heinrich at the Freie Universität zu Berlin, where his dissertation was published in 1995 as Unheiliges Römisches Reich: der konfessionelle Gegensatz 1648 bis 1806.  He followed this in 2003 with Preussen, Deutschland und Europa 1701-2001, a collection of essays edited with Vinzenz Czech and Bert Becker.

Military History 

Dr. Luh has published books in both German and English examining the nature of warfare in Europe in the Long Eighteenth Century.  He argued that, rather than looking at the eighteenth century for evidence of a "military revolution" which prefigured modern war, historians should examine the meaning that armies and warfare actually had for those living at the time.  He revealed that eighteenth-century warfare was deeply rooted in the structure of princely states and noble society of the time.  War aimed not to destroy the enemy but to win glory for the princes who waged it, and the appearance of both soldiers and armies (whether expressed in uniforms, or in elaborate parade-ground manoeuvres) was just as important as their actual capacity to do harm to the enemy.

Stiftung Preußischer Schlösser und Gärten 

Jürgen Luh is Wissenschaftler at the Stiftung Preußischer Schlösser und Gärten (SPSG).  In this capacity, he has helped put on a number of the SPSG's exhibitions, including 'Friederisiko'  in 2012 and 'Frauensache:  Wie Brandenburg Preußen wurde' in 2015.

Frederick the Great 

Dr. Luh has published extensively on the Prussian king Frederick the Great.  His 2011 book Der Große:  Friedrich II. von Preußen sought to resolve long-held ideas about the Prussian king's "contradictory" nature as both a patron of the Enlightenment and a military conqueror.  Luh argued that Frederick in fact sought glory consistently throughout his life, and that this took various forms.  Frederick saw his reputation as an author and a companion of Voltaire as simply an alternative way of achieving fame and immortality, alongside military success and the conquest of territory.

Dr. Luh was also the co-organiser, with Michael Kaiser and others, of the Friedrich300 series of colloquia to mark the 300th anniversary of Frederick's birth in 2012.  These presented important new research about Frederick, including explanations of the place of his literary activity within the wider programme of his reign.

Luh has also published numerous other works on Frederick, including a study of his brother Prince Henry's "Gallery of Heroes" at Schloss Rheinsberg, and a discussion of Frederick's enmity toward the Saxon chief minister Count Brühl.

Prussia After Napoleon 

Luh's latest book is Der Kurze Traum der Freiheit.  Preußen nach Napoleon.

Publications 

Unheiliges Römisches Reich: der konfessionelle Gegensatz 1648 bis 1806 (Potsdam, 1995)

Ancien Régime warfare and the military revolution: a study
(Groningen, 2000)

edited with Vinzenz Czech and Bert Becker, Preussen, Deutschland und Europa 1701-2001 (Groningen, 2003)

Kriegskunst in Europa: 1650 - 1800 (Köln und Böhlau, 2004)

Heinrichs Heroen:  Die Feldherrengalerie des Prinzen Heinrich im Schloss Rheinsberg (Berlin, 2007)

edited with Michael Kaiser and others, Friedrich300 Colloquien (2007-2013)

Der Große.  Friedrich II. von Preußen (München, 2011)

'Feinde fürs Leben.  Friedrich der Große und Heinrich von Brühl', in Neues Archiv für sächsische Geschichte.  Sonderdruck  Band 85 (2014)

Der Kurze Traum der Freiheit.  Preußen nach Napoleon (München, 2015)

References 

German military historians
1963 births
Living people